Kamali means perfection, integrity and is a Persian surname and may refer to:

People
 Saeed Kamali Dehghan, Iranian journalist
 Hossein Kamali, Iranian politician
 Mohammad Hashim Kamali, Afghan scholar
 Norma Kamali, American fashion designer
 Saba Kamali, Iranian actress
 Shahriar Kamali, Iranian bodybuilder
 Abdulla Al Kamali, Emirati football striker

Places
 Kamali, Estonia, a village in Saarde Parish, Pärnu County, Estonia
 Kamali, Bushehr, a village in Bushehr Province, Iran
 Kamali, Fars, a village in Fars Province, Iran

Other uses
 Kamali Tenywa, a character in the Ugandan television series Beneath The Lies

Persian-language surnames